Marion is a 1974 mini series about a young school teacher in rural Victoria in World War II. The series won a number of awards.

References

External links
Marion at IMDb

1970s Australian television miniseries
1974 Australian television series debuts
1974 Australian television series endings
1974 television films
1974 films
English-language television shows
World War II television series
Films directed by Keith Wilkes